Nicolas Rommens (born 17 December 1994) is a Belgian professional footballer who plays as a midfielder for Zulte Waregem in the Belgian First Division A.

Club career 

On 31 August 2013, Rommens made his professional debut for Westerlo in the Belgian Second Division against Visé. One year later, he made his Belgian Pro League debut on 26 July 2014 against Lokeren in a 1–0 home win. He replaced Evander Sno after 43 minutes.

At the age of 20, Rommens moved to second division team Dessel, who had already shown interest in signing him the winter before. Gilles Marchandise and Michiel Jaeken had also made the move from Westerlo to Dessel that summer. Rommens immediately made his mark with Dessel and returned to Westerlo a year later, where he would become a starter.

In the summer of 2019, he left Westerlo for Roeselare, who, like Westerlo, competed in the Belgian First Division B. When his contract expired a year later, he opted for the newly promoted RWDM.

In the summer of 2022, Rommens signed a three-year contract with Zulte Waregem.

References

External links
 

1994 births
Living people
Belgian footballers
K.V.C. Westerlo players
K.F.C. Dessel Sport players
K.S.V. Roeselare players
RWDM47 players
S.V. Zulte Waregem players
Belgian Pro League players
Challenger Pro League players
Association football midfielders
People from Lier, Belgium
Footballers from Antwerp Province